Ingvariella is a lichen genus in the family Stictidaceae. Circumscribed in 1997, the genus is monotypic, containing the single widespread lichen species Ingvariella bispora. The species was originally named Urceolaria bispora by Italian lichenologist Francesco Baglietto in 1871. Ingvariella is named in honour of Swedish lichenologist Ingvar Kärnefelt.

References

Ostropales
Taxa described in 1997
Lichen genera
Ostropales genera
Taxa named by Helge Thorsten Lumbsch